Charles Armand Etienne Thomas (1857–1892) was a French painter. He painted still lifes and landscapes of the sea.

References

1857 births
1892 deaths
19th-century French painters